Frederick II (30 November 1310 – 18 November 1349) was the margrave of Meissen from 1323 until his death.

Early life
Frederick was born on 30 November 1310 in Gotha. His parents were Margrave Frederick I of Meissen and Elisabeth von Lobdeburg-Arnshaugk. In 1323, under the guardianship of his mother, he succeeded his father in the Margraviate of Meissen and Thuringia.

Personal rule
After reaching the age of majority in 1329, he had to pass long-term fights with the vassals and neighbours. These conflicts mainly rose due to Frederick's declaration of peace in 1338, which drastically diminished the rights and influence of the small landlords and the local rulers, and which goal was the subjugation of the latter two groups. In 1342, dissatisfied nobles, whose concerns were their rights and independence, banded together in Arnstadt (southwest of Erfurt) against Frederick II, in what would be known as the Thuringian Count's War. The conflict would last up to 1346. After the death of Emperor Louis IV, the Bavarian party tried to move him to the acceptance of the German crown, however, he mistrusted the inconstancy of his voters and rejected such strange request in favour of Charles IV. Frederick II limited himself to consolidate his rule and to defend against the danger going out from Charles IV. At a meeting 1348 in Bautzen both recognized the existing possession states. Frederick died on 18 November 1349 in Wartburg.

Family
Frederick II married May 1323 in Nürnberg  Mathilde of Bavaria, daughter of Louis IV, Holy Roman Emperor and had 9 children:
Elisabeth (22 November 1329 – 21 April 1375), married to Frederick V of Nuremberg.
Frederick (born and died 1330)
Frederick III, Landgrave of Thuringia
Balthasar (1336-1406)
Beatrice (1 September 1339 – 15 July 1399), nun in Weißenfels
Louis (25 February 1340 – 17 February 1382), Bishop of Bamberg
William the One-eyed
Anne (7 August 1345 – 22 March 1363), nun in Seußlitz
Clara Elisabetta  (born 7 August 1345)

References

Sources

External links

People from Gotha (town)
Margraves of Meissen
Rulers of Thuringia
Landgraves of Thuringia
House of Wettin
Medieval child monarchs
1310 births
1349 deaths
Burials at Altzella Abbey